The 2004 J. League Division 2 season is the 33rd season of the second-tier club football in Japan and the 6th season since the establishment of J2 League.

In this season, twelve clubs competed in the quadruple round-robin format. Starting this season, promotion slots increased to 2.5 slots. The top two received automatic promotion and the third-placed finisher advanced to the Pro/Rele Series for the promotion. There were no relegation to the third-tier Japan Football League.

General

Promotion and relegation 
To be completed

Changes in competition formats 
To be completed

Changes in clubs 
To be completed

Clubs 

Following twelve clubs played in J. League Division 2 during 2004 season. Of these clubs, Vegalta Sendai and Kyoto Purple Sanga relegated from Division 1 last year.

 Consadole Sapporo
 Vegalta Sendai 
 Montedio Yamagata
 Mito HollyHocks
 Omiya Ardija
 Kawasaki Frontale
 Yokohama F.C.
 Shonan Bellmare
 Ventforet Kofu
 Kyoto Purple Sanga 
 Avispa Fukuoka
 Sagan Tosu

League format 
Twelve clubs will play in quadruple round-robin format, a total of 44 games each. A club receives 3 points for a win, 1 point for a tie, and 0 points for a loss. The clubs are ranked by points, and tie breakers are, in the following order:
 Goal differential
 Goals scored
 Head-to-head results
A draw would be conducted, if necessary. However, if two clubs are tied at the first place, both clubs will be declared as the champions. The top two clubs will be promoted to J1, while the 3rd placed club plays a two-legged Promotion/relegation series.
Changes from previous year
 Inception of Pro/Rele series for the 3rd place.

Final league table

Final results

Promotion / relegation Playoff 

Kashiwa Reysol won on 4-0 on aggregate, and therefore both clubs remained in their respective leagues.

Top scorers

Attendance figures

References

External links 
 rsssf.com

J2 League seasons
2
Japan
Japan